Marine Fighter Attack Training Squadron 502 (VMFAT-502) is a United States Marine Corps fighter attack training squadron flying the Lockheed Martin F-35 Lightning II. Known as the "Flying Nightmares", the squadron maintains the history of Marine Attack Squadron 513 (VMA-513) which dates back to World War II and was decommissioned on 12 July 2013.  The squadron is based at Marine Corps Air Station Miramar and falls under the command of Marine Aircraft Group 11 and the 3rd Marine Aircraft Wing

History

World War II
Marine Attack Squadron 513 was first commissioned as VMF-513 on February 15, 1944 at Marine Corps Auxiliary Field Oak Grove, North Carolina, flying the Grumman F6F Hellcat.  The squadron was transferred to Marine Corps Air Facility Walnut Ridge, Arkansas in September 1944.

In December of the same year, the squadron moved to Marine Corps Auxiliary Air Station Mojave, California where it was re-designated VMF(CVS)-513. In addition, they provided close air support for the 3rd Marine Division during the Battle of Okinawa, Japan.

Korean War
Between World War II and the Korean War, VMF-513 operated from Marine Corps Air Station El Toro, California. Transitioning to the F4U-5N, the squadron was re-designated VMF(N)-513 ("Night Fighters"). In August 1950, the squadron deployed to Japan under operational control of the U.S. 5th Air Force.

The squadron nickname "Flying Nightmares" was coined by then Commanding Officer, LtCol James R. Anderson, USMC, in March 1951 because he thought it most appropriately described his outfit . At this time the squadron, with its 15 F7F "Tigercats" and 15 F4U-5N "Corsairs," were flying out of Pusan West (K-1) Air Base and providing the sole night fighter air defense and interdiction support to all UN forces. In this month alone, the squadron flew 2,086 hours in 604 night combat sorties, inflicting severe damage on the Chinese Forces tactical and logistical units.

During the summer of 1952, VMF(N)-513 received the F3D Skyknight, the squadron's first jet aircraft. Due to losses being incurred by B-29 Superfortresses on nighttime raids over North Korea, 1st MAW was asked to assign their night fighter squadron to escort the aircraft. On the early morning of November 3, 1952, VMF(N)-513 made aviation history with the first radar kill on an enemy jet aircraft at night, when Maj. William T. Stratton Jr., and MSgt Hans Hoglind shot down a North Korean Yak-15.  The squadron was credited with 10 confirmed night kills during the Korean War.

Following the war, the squadron operated out of NAS Atsugi, Japan. On 26 July 1958, VMF-513 received the F4D Skyray aircraft. In October 1962, VMF(AW)-513 was relocated from NAS Atsugi Japan to MCAS El Toro, California. The outfit was effectively disbanded in Japan and reformed in El Toro under a new CO, who organized new pilots and maintenance Marines to operate the now "old" F-4D Skyrays while the Flying Nightmares awaited delivery of the brand new F-4 Phantom II. This occurred in early 1963 and most of the Nightmare pilots did their transition training at nearby NAS Miramar, at the Navy's replacement squadron.

The 1960s

On August 1, 1963, the squadron was re-designated VMFA-513 and by the end of the year, the Nightmares were exclusively flying F-4's, the third Phantom II squadron in the Marine Corps. They trained in the F-4B at MCAS El Toro through October 1964, when they deployed once again to NAS Atsugi, Japan. In June 1965, the Nightmares replaced VMFA-531 at Da Nang Air Base, South Vietnam for five months of combat and, for a while, were the only Marine jet fighters in country. In August 1965, VMFA-513 supported the 7th Marine Regiment in Operation Starlitethe first major American operation of the war.  This one-year overseas deployment ended in October 1965 and the squadron executed another wholesale personnel rotation, this time reforming at MCAS Cherry Point, North Carolina.

The 1970s and 1980s

The squadron flew the F-4B "Phantom" until June 30, 1970, when it was re-commissioned in a cadre status, awaiting delivery of the first Marine AV-8A Harrier on April 16, 1971. The squadron was the first Marine Corps squadron to receive the AV-8A and upon acceptance of the AV-8A. During November 1976, VMA-513 returned to the United States and was assigned to Marine Combat Crew Readiness Training Group 10 at MCAS Yuma, Arizona (re-designated Marine Aircraft Group 13 on October 1, 1987).

VMA-513 deployed as part of HMM-265 (REIN) ‘Dragons’ aboard USS Tarawa (LHA-1) as part of Task Group 76.3/Amphibious Ready Group Alfa/Amphibious Squadron Seven, from 14 October 1980, visiting Subic Bay, PI and participating in exercises Valiant Blitz in the Philippines, Amphibious Squadron Seven spent almost a week at Phattaya Beach, from 22 to 27 December, before moving on to Singapore where she arrived on the 30th. After operations in Diego Garcia where Amphibious Squadron Seven's embarked Marines carried out a landing exercise between 28 and 30 January, they headed south east for exercise Valiant Usher 81-3 off Lancelin, Western Australia with units of the Australian Military. After Valiant Usher off Western Australia, VMA-513 and Amphibious Squadron One conducted an R&R visit to Perth/Fremantle, Western Australia from 8–13 February 1981. The squadron later took part in exercises Team Spirit 81 and Valiant Flex 81-2 at Pusan (Busan) South Korea. VMA-513 arrived back at MCAS Yuma, AZ on or about 16 April 1981.

In October 1987, the squadron received the improved AV-8B Harrier II.

The Gulf War

In February 1991, VMA-513 deployed for operations in Operation Desert Storm and Desert Shield, employing their new Harrier II's in support of the 15th Marine Expeditionary Unit; logging 103 combat sorties with no losses. At this time, VMA-513 effectively conducted combat operations from austere sites in Southwest Asia. The Nightmares returned home with all of their assets and no loss of life or major injury. Throughout the 1990s and early 21st century the squadron continued to support Marine Expeditionary Units aboard ship for normal six-month-long deployments to the Western Pacific and Persian Gulf.

Global War on Terror

From October 2002 to September 2003, VMA-513 (-) (REIN) deployed to Bagram Air Base, Afghanistan for combat operations in support of Operation Enduring Freedom. Throughout their year in sustained combat, the Marines and Sailors of VMA-513 (-) (REIN) provided close air support, armed reconnaissance, and combat escort for the United States and over 20 Coalition countries of the Combined Joint Task Force 180. Throughout its time in combat in Afghanistan, the squadron amassed 1,250 combat sorties and 3,764 flight hours with only six aircraft while operating from a remote austere forward combat base. Additionally, VMA-513 (-) (REIN) flew 1,833.7 nighttime hours; thus, providing day and night precision strike capability for American and Coalition units with the newly introduced Litening II Targeting Pod. VMA-513 (-) (REIN) supported numerous US and Coalition operations that led to the capture or destruction of many Al Queda and Taliban enemy forces.  While the squadron minus was deployed to Afghanistan, a six plane detachment was also deployed twice with Marine Expeditionary Units aboard ship and flew combat missions in support of Operation Iraqi Freedom (OIF) and operations on the Horn of Africa.

In February 2006, the Flying Nightmares were again deployed to Al Asad Airbase, Iraq, to  provide close air ground support for ground units in the Iraq area.  The squadron flew 4519 combat hours with a sortie completion rate of over 95%. On May 11, 2006, VMA-513 became the first Harrier unit to drop a JDAM (Joint Direct Attack Munition) in combat when it struck targets with a GBU-38 500 lb JDAM.

Decommissioning and Recommissioning
On July 12, 2013, VMA-513 was decommissioned after 69 years of service.  The squadron's remaining aircraft were transferred to sister squadron, VMA-214.

The squadron was recommissioned on June 26, 2020 as Marine Fighter Attack Training Squadron 502, the Marine Corps' second F-35B Fleet Replacement Squadron (FRS).

Other information
 In 2002 a VMF-513 Sergeant missing since 30 May 1953 {Korean War} was laid to rest at Arlington National Cemetery.
 An AV-8C Harrier with VMA-513 markings is on display at the Pima Air & Space Museum in Tucson, Arizona.
 LtCol. Michael Franzak (USMC, Ret.), the former Executive Officer of VMA-513, is the author of a book, A Nightmare's Prayer, detailing the squadron's exploits during its yearlong deployment to Afghanistan from 2002 to 2003
 An F-4B Phantom II from VMFA-513 appeared in an episode of The Man from U.N.C.L.E., "The Yellow Scarf Affair" on January 25, 1965.

Gallery

See also

 United States Marine Corps Aviation
 Organization of the United States Marine Corps
 List of active United States Marine Corps aircraft squadrons

Citations

References

Bibliography
 
 
 
 
 

Web
 VMFAT-502's official webpage
 Nightmares in Afghanistan – Naval Aviation News (May–June 2003)

Fighter attack squadrons of the United States Marine Corps
Training squadrons of the United States Marine Corps
FS0513